The Tomboy is a 1924 American silent comedy-drama film directed by David Kirkland and starring Herbert Rawlinson and Dorothy Devore.

Plot
As described in a review in a film magazine, Tommy Smith (Devore), the village tomboy, runs a boarding house because her mother (Boardman) is dead and her father (Barrows) is lazy. A stranger appears and begins making love to Tommy. Coincident with her discovery of liquor in the barn and the fact that the stranger, Aldon Farwell (Rawlinson), is a revenue agent, she is led to believe that her father is a bootlegger. The Sheriff (Moran) is killed and her father is accused of the murder. Bootleggers make way with a truck and Aldon and Tommy join the chase. When captured, it develops that Rugby Blood (Gribbon), posing as an invalid, is the leader of the bootleggers and has been disguising as her father, while her father has been working on the case with Aldon. Tommy also discovers that Aldon's love for her is real.

Cast

Preservation
A print of The Tomboy is preserved at the Library of Congress.

References

External links

1924 films
American silent feature films
Films based on short fiction
1924 comedy-drama films
1920s English-language films
American black-and-white films
1920s American films
Silent American comedy-drama films